Kunhegyes is a district in north-eastern part of Jász-Nagykun-Szolnok County. Kunhegyes is also the name of the town where the district seat is found. The district is located in the Northern Great Plain Statistical Region. This district is a part of Nagykunság historical and geographical region.

Geography 
Kunhegyes District borders with Heves District (Heves County) to the northwest, Tiszafüred District to the northeast, Karcag District to the east and south, Törökszentmiklós District to the south, Szolnok District to the west. The number of the inhabited places in Kunhegyes District is 7.

Municipalities 
The district has 2 towns and 5 villages.
(ordered by population, as of 1 January 2012)

The bolded municipalities are cities.

Demographics

In 2011, it had a population of 20,045 and the population density was 43/km².

Ethnicity
Besides the Hungarian majority, the main minority is the Roma (approx. 4,000).

Total population (2011 census): 20,045
Ethnic groups (2011 census): Identified themselves: 21,823 persons:
Hungarians: 18,049 (82.71%)
Gypsies: 3,595 (16.47%)
Others and indefinable: 179 (0.82%)
Approx. 2,000 persons in Kunhegyes District did declare more than one ethnic group at the 2011 census.

Religion
Religious adherence in the county according to 2011 census:

Catholic – 4,742 (Roman Catholic – 4,712; Greek Catholic – 30);
Reformed – 4,010;
Evangelical – 19;
other religions – 189; 
Non-religious – 7,496; 
Atheism – 106;
Undeclared – 3,483.

Transport

Road network
Main road  (N→S):  Tiszafüred... – Kunhegyes District (1 municipality: Kunhegyes) – ...Fegyvernek

Railway network
Line 102 (N→S): Kál-Kápolna (80, 84)... –Kunhegyes District (2 municipalities: Abádszalók, Kunhegyes) – ...Kisújszállás (100)

Gallery

See also
List of cities and towns of Hungary

References

External links
Kunhegyes District - HunMix.hu
Postal codes of the Kunhegyes District

Districts in Jász-Nagykun-Szolnok County